Fraternitas Liviensis (also Korp! Fraternitas Liviensis) is an all-male academic corporation in Estonia. It was established on 28 January 1918.

See also
Characterization of German Student Corps
League of Estonian Corporations

References

External links

1918 establishments in Estonia
Organizations established in 1918